The governments of the German Empire and Nazi Germany (under Adolf Hitler) ordered, organized and condoned a substantial number of war crimes, first in the Herero and Namaqua genocide and then in the First and Second World Wars. The most notable of these is the Holocaust in which millions of Jews and Romani were systematically murdered. Millions of civilians and prisoners of war also died as a result of German abuse, mistreatment, and deliberate starvation policies in those two conflicts. Much of the evidence was deliberately destroyed by the perpetrators, such as in Sonderaktion 1005, in an attempt to conceal the crimes.

Pre-World War I

Considered to have been the first genocide of the 20th century, the Herero and Namaqua Genocide was perpetrated by the German Empire between 1904 and 1907 in German South West Africa (modern-day Namibia), during the Scramble for Africa. On January 12, 1904, the Herero people, led by Samuel Maharero, rebelled against German colonialism. In August, General Lothar von Trotha of the Imperial German Army defeated the Herero in the Battle of Waterberg and drove them into the desert of Omaheke, where most of them died of thirst. In October, the Nama people also rebelled against the Germans only to suffer a similar fate.

In total, from 24,000 up to 100,000 Herero and 10,000 Nama died. The genocide was characterized by widespread death by starvation and thirst because the Herero who fled the violence were prevented from returning from the Namib Desert. Some sources also claim that the German colonial army systematically poisoned wells in the desert.

World War I

Documentation regarding German war crimes in World War I was seized and destroyed by Nazi Germany during World War II, after occupying France, along with monuments commemorating their victims.

Chemical weapons in warfare

Poison gas was first introduced as a weapon by Imperial Germany, and subsequently used by all major belligerents, in violation of the 1899 Hague Declaration Concerning Asphyxiating Gases and the 1907 Hague Convention on Land Warfare, which explicitly forbade the use of "poison or poisoned weapons" in warfare.

Belgium 

In August 1914, as part of the Schlieffen Plan, the German Army invaded and occupied the neutral nation of Belgium without explicit warning, which violated a treaty of 1839 that the German chancellor dismissed as a "scrap of paper" and the 1907 Hague Convention on Opening of Hostilities. Within the first two months of the war, the German occupiers terrorized the Belgians, killing thousands of civilians and looting and burning scores of towns, including Leuven, which housed the country's preeminent university, mainly in retaliation for Belgian guerrilla warfare, (see francs-tireurs). This action was in violation of the 1907 Hague Convention on Land Warfare provisions that prohibited collective punishment of civilians and looting and destruction of civilian property in occupied territories.

Bombardment of English coastal towns

The raid on Scarborough, Hartlepool and Whitby, which took place on December 16, 1914, was an attack by the Imperial German Navy on the British seaport towns of Scarborough, Hartlepool, West Hartlepool, and Whitby. The attack resulted in 137 fatalities and 592 casualties. The raid was in violation of the ninth section of the 1907 Hague Convention which prohibited naval bombardments of undefended towns without warning, because only Hartlepool was protected by shore batteries. Germany was a signatory of the 1907 Hague Convention. Another attack followed on 26 April 1916 on the coastal towns of Yarmouth and Lowestoft but both were important naval bases and defended by shore batteries.

Unrestricted submarine warfare

Unrestricted submarine warfare was instituted in 1915 in response to the British naval blockade of Germany. Prize rules, which were codified under the 1907 Hague Convention—such as those that required commerce raiders to warn their targets and allow time for the crew to board lifeboats—were disregarded and commercial vessels were sunk regardless of nationality, cargo, or destination. However, Germany resumed the practice on 1 February 1917 and declared that all merchant ships regardless of nationalities would be sunk without warning. This outraged the U.S. public, prompting the U.S. to break diplomatic relations with Germany two days later, and, along with the Zimmermann Telegram, led the U.S. entry into the war two months later on the side of the Allied Powers.

World War II

Chronologically, the first German World War II crime, and also the very first act of the war, was the bombing of Wieluń, a town where no targets of military value were present.

More significantly, The Holocaust of the Jews, the Action T4 killing of the disabled and the Porajmos of the Romani are the most notable war crimes committed by Nazi Germany during World War II. Not all of the crimes committed during the Holocaust and similar mass atrocities were war crimes. Telford Taylor (The U.S. prosecutor in the German High Command case at the Nuremberg Trials and Chief Counsel for the twelve trials before the U.S. Nuremberg Military Tribunals) explained in 1982:

German mistreatment of Soviet prisoners of war – at least 3.3 million Soviet POWs died in German custody, out of 5.7 million captured; this figure represents 57% POW casualty rate.
Le Paradis massacre, May 1940, British soldiers of the Royal Norfolk Regiment, were captured by the SS and subsequently murdered. Fritz Knoechlein was tried, found guilty and hanged.
Wormhoudt massacre, May 1940, British and French soldiers captured by the SS and subsequently murdered. No one was found guilty of the crime.
Lidice massacre after assassination of Reinhard Heydrich in 1942, when the Czech village was utterly destroyed, and inhabitants murdered.
Normandy Massacres, a series of killings in which up to 156 Canadian prisoners of war were murdered by soldiers of the 12th SS Panzer Division (Hitler Youth) during the Battle of Normandy
Ardenne Abbey massacre, one of the Normandy massacres; June 1944 Canadian soldiers captured by the SS and murdered by 12th SS Panzer Division Hitlerjugend. SS General Kurt Meyer (Panzermeyer) sentenced to be shot 1946; sentence commuted; released 1954
Graignes massacre, 11 June 1944, United States POWs that had surrendered were executed by the German troops by shooting and stabbing.
Malmedy massacre, December 1944, United States POWs captured by Kampfgruppe Peiper were murdered outside of Malmedy, Belgium.
 Wereth massacre. 17 December 1944, soldiers from 3./SS-PzAA1 LSSAH captured eleven African-American soldiers from 333rd Artillery Battalion in the hamlet of Wereth, Belgium. Subsequently, the prisoners were tortured, shot, and had their fingers cut off, legs broken, eyes gouged out, jaw broken and at least one was shot while trying to bandage a comrade's wounds.
 Wahlhausen massacre, December 1944, United States Pows from the 28th Infantry Division captured by German troops were summarily executed.
Gardelegen (war crime) of April 1945 when Nazi concentration camp prisoners were herded into a barn, which was then set alight, killing all inside
Oradour-sur-Glane massacre
Massacre of Kalavryta
Unrestricted submarine warfare against merchant shipping.
The intentional destruction of major medieval churches of Novgorod, of monasteries in the Moscow region (e.g., of New Jerusalem Monastery) and of the imperial palaces around St. Petersburg (many of them were left by the post-war authorities in ruins or simply demolished).
The campaign of extermination of Slavic population in the occupied territories. Several thousand villages were burned with their entire population (e.g., Khatyn massacre in Belarus). A quarter of the inhabitants of Belarus did not survive the German occupation.
Soap made from human corpses produced on a small-scale by German scientist Rudolf Spanner.
Commando Order, the secret order issued by Hitler in October 1942 stating that Allied combatants encountered during commando operations were to be executed immediately without trial, even if they were properly uniformed, unarmed, or intending to surrender.
Commissar Order, the order from Hitler to Wehrmacht troops before the invasion of the Soviet Union in 1941 to shoot Commissars immediately on capture.
Nacht und Nebel decree of 1941 for disappearance of prisoners.

War criminals 
 List of Axis personnel indicted for war crimes
 List of Nazi doctors
 Adolf Eichmann
 Heinrich Gross
 Hans Heinze
 Rudolf Hoess
 Karl Linnas
 Josef Mengele
 Otmar Freiherr von Verschuer
 Alfred Trzebinski

Massacres and war crimes of World War II by location

Austria 
Murders of disabled children by Heinrich Gross 
Recommendation of disabled children for euthanasia by Hans Asperger

Belarus 
The Holocaust in Belarus
Anti-partisan operations in Belarus
Operation Bamberg
Operation Cottbus

 1941
27 October, Slutsk, Slutsk Affair (4,000 people, including women and children)
28 September – 17 October, Pleszczenice-Bischolin-Szack (Šacak)-Bobr-Uzda (White Ruthenia) massacre (1,126 children)

 1942
 26 March – 6 April, Operation Bamberg (Hłusk, Bobrujsk; 4,396 people, including children)
 April 29 and August 10, 1942, Dzyatlava massacre, Diatłowo (Dzyatlava); 3,000- 5,000 people, including women and children
9 – 12 May, Kliczów-Bobrujsk massacre (520 people, including children)
Beginning of June, Słowodka-Bobrujsk massacre (1,000 people, including children)
15 June Borki (powiat białostocki) massacre (1,741 people, including children)
21 June Zbyszin massacre (1,076 people, including children)
25 June Timkowiczi massacre (900 people, including children)
26 June Studenka massacre (836 people, including children)
18 July, Jelsk massacre (1,000 people, including children)
15 July – 7 August, Operation Adler (Bobrujsk, Mohylew, Berezyna; 1,381 people, including children)
14 – 20 August, Operation Greif (Orsza, Witebsk; 796 people, including children)
22 August – 21 September, Operation Sumpffieber (White Ruthenia; 10,063 people, including children)
August, Bereźne massacre
22 September – 26 September (Małoryta massacre; 4,038 people, including children)
23 September – 3 October, Operation Blitz (Połock, Witebsk; 567 people, including children)
11 – 23 October, Operation Karlsbad (Orsza, Witebsk; 1,051 people, including children)
23 – 29 November, Operation Nürnberg (Dubrowka; 2,974 people, including children)
December, Mirnaya massacre, Mirnaya (Мірная), Belarus (be); 147 including women and children
10 – 21 December, Operation Hamburg (Niemen River-Szczara River; 6,172 people, including children)
22 – 29 December, Operation Altona (Słonim; 1,032 people, including children)

 1943
6 – 14 January, Operation Franz (Grodsjanka; 2,025 people, including children)
10 – 11 January, Operation Peter (Kliczów, Kolbcza; 1,400 people, including children)
18 – 23 January, Słuck-Mińsk-Czerwień massacre (825 people, including children)
28 January – 15 February, Operation Schneehase (Połock, Rossony, Krasnopole; 2,283 people, including children); 54; 37
Until 28 January, Operation Erntefest I (Czerwień, Osipowicze; 1,228 people, including children)
Jaanuar, Operation Eisbär (between Briańsk and Dmitriev-Lgowski)
Until 1 February, Operation Waldwinter (Sirotino-Trudy; 1,627 people, including children)
8 – 26 February, Operation Hornung (Lenin, Hancewicze; 12,897 people, including children)
Until 9 February, Operation Erntefest II (Słuck, Kopyl; 2,325 people, including children)
15 February – end of March, Operation Winterzauber (Oświeja, Latvian border; 3,904 people, including children)
22 February – 8 March, Operation Kugelblitz (Połock, Oświeja, Dryssa, Rossony; 3,780 people, including children)
Until 19 March, Operation Nixe (Ptycz, Mikaszewicze, Pińsk; 400 people, including children)
Until 21 March, Operation Föhn (Pińsk; 543 people, including children)
21 March – 2 April, Operation Donnerkeil (Połock, Witebsk; 542 people, including children)
March 22, Khatyn massacre, Khatyn; 149 people including women and children
1 – 9 May, Operation Draufgänger II (Rudnja and Manyly forest; 680 people, including children)
17 – 21 May, Operation Maigewitter (Witebsk, Suraż, Gorodok; 2,441 people, including children)
20 May – 23 June, Operation Cottbus (Lepel, Begomel, Uszacz; 11,796 people, including children)
27 May – 10 June, Operation Weichsel (Dniepr-Prypeć triangle, South-West of Homel; 4,018 people, including children)
13 – 16 June, Operation Ziethen (Rzeczyca; 160 people, including children)
25 June – 27 July, Operation Seydlitz (Owrucz-Mozyrz; 5,106 people, including children)
30 July, Mozyrz massacre (501 people, including children)
Until 14 July, Operation Günther (Woloszyn, Lagoisk; 3,993 people, including children)
13 July – 11 August, Operation Hermann (Iwie, Nowogródek, Woloszyn, Stołpce; 4,280 people, including children)
24 September – 10 October, Operation Fritz (Głębokie; 509 people, including children)
9 October – 22 October, Stary Bychów massacre (1,769 people, including children)
1 November – 18 November, Operation Heinrich (Rossony, Połock, Idrica; 5,452 people, including children)
December, Spasskoje massacre (628 people, including children)
December, Biały massacre (1,453 people, including children)
20 December – 1 January 1944, Operation Otto (Oświeja; 1,920 people, including children)

 1944
14 January, Oła massacre (1,758 people, including children)
22 January, Baiki massacre (987 people, including children)
3 – 15 February, Operation Wolfsjagd (Hłusk, Bobrujsk; 467 people, including children)
5 – 6 February,  (near Buczacz) massacre (126 people, including children; see :pl:Zbrodnie w Baryszu)
Until 19 February, Operation Sumpfhahn (Hłusk, Bobrujsk; 538 people, including children)
Beginning of March, Berezyna-Bielnicz massacre (686 people, including children)
7 – 17 April, Operation Auerhahn (Bobrujsk; c. 1,000 people, including children)
17 April – 12 May, Operation Frühlingsfest (Połock, Uszacz; 7,011 people, including children)
25 May – 17 June, Operation Kormoran;  (Wilejka, Borysów, Minsk; 7,697 people, including children)
2 June – 13 June, Operation Pfingsrose (Talka; 499 people, including children)
June, Operation Pfingstausnlug (Sienno; 653 people, including children)
June, Operation Windwirbel (Chidra; 560 people, including children)

Belgium 

 1940
May 25, Vinkt Massacre (Vinkt, East Flanders; 86-140 people, including children)

1944
August 18, Courcelles Massacre (Courcelles, Hainaut Province; 20 People, including children)
December, Malmedy massacres (Malmedy and surrounding region; at least 373 American POWS)
Dec 17, Baugnez crossroads massacre (Baugnez (near Malmedy), Liège Province; 81 American POWS)
Dec 17, Wereth massacre (Wereth, Liège Province; 11 American POWS)
Dec 24,  (Bande, Luxembourg Province; 34 People aged between 20 and 31 years old)

Croatia
1943
30 November 1943, Ivanci massacre (73 killed) 
1944
26-30 March 1944, Massacre of villages under Kamešnica (1,525 killed, including children)
 30 April 1944, Lipa massacre (269 killed, including 96 children)

Czechoslovakia 

 17 November Raid against universities and colleges
 First Martial Law (First Heydrichiada in Prague)
 First Martial Law (First Heydrichiada in Brno)
 Lidice massacre
 Ležáky massacre
 Liquidation of the Theresienstadt concentration camp
 "Transport of Death" in Brandýs nad Orlicí
 "Transport of Death" in Stod (Czech Republic)
 Jablunkov Massacre
 "Transport of Death" in Nýřany
 Killing in the Mikulov clay pit
 Murder in Gästehaus
 Ploština Massacre
 Zákřov Massacre
 Court-martial in Medlánky
 Prlov Massacre
 Salaš Massacre
 Suchý Massacre
 Letovice Massacre
 Last execution in Theresienstadt
 Execution in Lazce
 Execution in Fort XIII
 "Transport of Death" in Olbramovice
 Podbořany-Kaštice Death march
 Javoříčko Massacre
 Brandýs Tragedy
 Volary Deat march
 Velké Meziříčí Massacre
 Leskovice Massacre
 Úsobská street Massacre
 Psáry Massacre
 Lednice Massacre
 Kolín massacre
 Třešť massacre
 Velké Popovice massacre
 Lahovice massacre
 Masarykovo nádraží massacre
 Massacre in Trhová Kamenice
 Malín tragedy
 Kobylisy Shooting Range, a site of execution for primarily political prisoners
 Životice massacre
 War crimes during the Prague uprising included using civilians as human shields, summary executions and massacres
 Massacre in Trhová Kamenice

Estonia 
The Holocaust in Estonia
Murders of children by Karl Linnas

 1941
2 November, Mass murder of children in Pärnu synagogue (34 children)

 1942
27 March Murder of Pliner children (Holocaust in Estonia; 3 children)

France 

Affair of 27 martyrs 25 August 1945
Ascq massacre April 1944
Ardenne Abbey massacre of British and Canadian troops by Waffen-SS
Drancy internment camp murders
Dortan Massacre
Dun-les-Places massacre
First Saint-Julien massacre
Graignes massacre (Graignes, 17 American prisoners were massacred.)
Izieu orphanage deportations to Auschwitz, 6 April 1944
Karl Hotz reprisals
Le Paradis massacre
Massacre of the Bois d'Eraine
Maillé massacre
Penguerec massacre
Massacre de la vallée de la Saulx
Saint-Genis-Laval massacre
Second Saint-Julien massacre
Tragedy of the Guerry's wells
Tulle massacre, 9 June 1944
Oradour-sur-Glane massacre (642  men, women and children) 10 June 1944
Wormhoudt massacre

Germany 

Action T4
Murders of children in the Hadamar Clinic (NS-Tötungsanstalt Hadamar) mostly by Irmgard Huber
Murders of children by Hans Heinze
Otmar Freiherr von Verschuer#Involvement in Nazi human experimentation

 1945
8 April - The Celle Massacre
13 April - Gardelegen Massacre
20 April - Murder of 20 children by Alfred Trzebinski

Greece 

Massacre of Kleisoura (Macedonia, 270 women and children)
Massacre of Kondomari (Crete, 60 men, mainly elder)
Massacre of Pikermi (Pikermi, 54, including women and children)
Pyrgoi (former Katranitsa) massacre (Pyrgoi, 346, including women and children)
Razing of Kandanos  (Crete, 180, including women and children)
Holocaust of Viannos (Crete, 500+, including women and children)
Distomo massacre (Central Greece, 218, including women and children)
Drakeia massacre (Thessaly, 118 men)
Holocaust of Kedros (Crete, 164, including women and children)
Massacre of Kommeno (Epirus, 317, including women and children)
Massacre of Kalavryta (Peloponnese, 1,200+, including women and children)
Burnings of Kali Sykia (Crete, 13, women)
Lyngiades massacre (Epirus), 92, mostly infants, children, women and elderly
Massacre of the Acqui Division (Kefalonia, 5,000, Italian anti-fascist troops)
Mesovouno massacre (Macedonia, 268, including women and children)
Paramythia executions (Epirus, 201, including women and children)
The Massacre of Chortiatis (Macedonia, 146, including women and children)
Executions of Kaisariani (Athens, 200+, all civilians)
Massacre of Mousiotitsa (Epirus, 153, including women and children)
Malathyros executions (Malathyros, 61, including women and children)
Executions of Kokkinia (Athens, 300+, all civilians, assisted by Security Battalions)
Kallikratis executions (Crete, 30, including women and children)
Alikianos executions (Crete, 118, all civilians)
Razing of Anogeia (Crete, unknown, including women and children)
Skourvoula (Crete, at least 36, all civilians)

In addition, more than 90 villages and towns are recorded from the Hellenic network of martyr cities. During the triple German, Italian and Bulgarian, occupation about 800,000 people lost their lives in Greece (see World War II casualties).

Italy 

Castiglione massacre, 12–14 August 1943, Castiglione di Sicilia, 1st Fallschirm-Panzer Division Hermann Göring massacres 16 civilians and wounds 20.
Boves massacre, 8 September 1943, Boves, Mass killing of 23 citizens (with another 22 wounded) by German 1st SS Panzer Division Leibstandarte SS Adolf Hitler occupation troops under Joachim Peiper
Lake Maggiore massacres, September–October 1943, Lake Maggiore, Murder of 56 predominantly Italian Jews by the 1st SS Panzer Division despite strict German orders not to carry out any violence against civilians
Caiazzo massacre, 13 October 1943, Caiazzo, Mass killing of 22 civilians by the German 29th Panzergrenadier Regiment occupation troops under Lt. Richard Heinz Wolfgang Lehnigk-Emden
Ardeatine massacre (Rome, Lazio; 335 prisoners executed)
Guardistallo massacre (Guardistallo, Tuscany; 46 civilians killed on 29 June 1944)
Piazza Tasso massacre, 17 July 1944, Florence, 5 Italian civilians killed in massacre by Fascists and German Army
12 August 1944, Sant'Anna di Stazzema massacre (Sant'Anna di Stazzema, Tuscany; 560 people, including children)
San Terenzo Monti massacre (Fivizzano, Tuscany; 110 civilians and 52 political prisoners killed on 21 August 1944)
Padule di Fucecchio massacre (Fucecchio, Tuscany; 176 civilians killed on 23 August 1944)
Vinca massacre (Fivizzano, Tuscany; between 160 and 178 civilians executed on 24 August 1944)
Certosa di Farneta massacre (Lucca, Tuscany; 60 civilians killed between 2 and 10 September 1944)
29 September – 5 October 1944, Marzabotto massacre (Marzabotto, Emilia-Romagna; between 770 and 1,830 civilians killed)
29 June 1944, Civitella-Cornia-San Pancrazio massacre (Abruzzo; 203 people, including children)
Cuneo massacre (Cuneo, Piedmont; 189 civilians and partisans killed in two separate massacres)
Cavriglia-Castelnuovo dei Sabbioni massacre (Tuscany; 173 civilians killed on 4 July 1944)
Fosse del Frigido massacre (Massa, Tuscany; 146-149 prisoners murdered on 10 September 1944)
Pietransieri massacre (Roccaraso, Abruzzo; 128 civilians killed on 21 November 1943)
Stia massacre (Stia, Tuscany; 122 civilians killed between 12 and 15 April 1944)
Valla massacre (Fivizzano, Tuscany; 103 civilians killed on 19 August 1944)
Serra di Ronchidoso massacre (Gaggio Montano, Emilia-Romagna; over 100 civilians killed on 28–29 September 1944)
Verghereto massacre (Verghereto, Emilia-Romagna; 96 civilians killed between 22 and 25 July 1944)
Massacre of Monchio, Susano and Costrignano (Palagano, Emilia-Romagna; between 79 and 136 civilians killed on 18 March 1944)
Leonessa and Cumulata massacre (Leonessa, Lazio; 51 civilians killed between 2 and 7 April 1944)
Cumiana massacre (Cumiana, Piedmont; 51 civilians killed on 3 April 1944)
Tavolicci massacre (Verghereto, Emilia-Romagna; 64 civilians killed on 22 July 1944)
Forno massacre (Massa, Tuscany; 72 civilians killed on 13 June 1944)
Gubbio massacre (Gubbio, Umbria; 40 civilians executed on 22 June 1944)
Valdine massacre (Fivizzano, Tuscany; 52 hostages executed in August 1944)
Casaglia massacre (Marzabotto, Emilia-Romagna; 42 civilians killed on 29 September 1944)
 massacre in Carrara (Carrara, Tuscany; 72 civilians killed on 16 September 1944)
Madonna dell'Albero massacre (Ravenna, Emilia-Romagna; 56 civilians killed on 27 November 1944)
"La Romagna" massacre (Molina di Quosa, San Giuliano Terme, Tuscany; 75 civilians killed on 11 August 1944)
San Polo di Arezzo massacre (Arezzo, Tuscany; 65 civilians killed on 14 July 1944)
Massaciuccoli-Massarosa massacre (Massaciuccoli, Massarosa, Tuscany; 41 civilians killed between 2 and 5 September 1944)
Fossoli-Carpi massacre (Carpi, Emilia-Romagna; 67 civilians killed on 12 July 1944)
Turchino Pass massacre (Fontanafredda, Liguria; 59 civilians executed on 19 May 1944)
Pedescala massacre (Valdastico, Veneto; 82 civilians killed between 30 April and 2 May 1945)

Latvia 
The Holocaust in Latvia

 1941
30 November and 8 December, Rumbula massacre (25,000 people, including children)

Lithuania 

The Holocaust in Lithuania

 1941
13 July – 21 August Daugavpils massacre by Einsatzkommando 3 (9,585 people, including children)
July–August 1944, Ponary massacre (c. 100,000 people, including children)
18 August – 22 August, Kreis Rasainiai massacre (1,020 children)
19 August, Ukmerge massacre (88 children)
Summer-autumn-winter, Complete murder of native Jewish population in Estonia (900 individuals, including 101 children)
1 September, Marijampolė massacre (1,404 children)
2 September, Wilno massacre (817 children)
4 September, Čekiškė massacre (60 children)
4 September, Seredžius massacre (126 children)
4 September, Veliuona massacre (86 children)
4 September, Zapyškis massacre (13 children)
6 September – 8 September, Raseiniai massacre (415 children)
6 September – 8 September, Jurbork massacre (412 people, including children)
29 October, Kaunas massacre (4,273 children)
25 November, Kauen-F.IX massacre (175 children)

Netherlands 
 1940
14 May, Rotterdam bombing (nearly 1,000 people were killed and 85,000 made homeless.)

 1944
1 October, Putten raid (552 deaths)
5 November, Heusden Town Hall Massacre (134 people, including 74 children)

Norway 
Attempted deportation of children of Jewish Children's Home in Oslo

Poland 

The Holocaust in Poland
Bombing of Wieluń
Borów massacre (103 children)
Expulsion of Poles by Nazi Germany
German AB-Aktion in Poland
Gmina Aleksandrów, Lublin Voivodeship
Gmina Besko
Gmina Gidle
Gmina Kłecko
Gmina Ryczywół
Gmina Siennica
Huta Pieniacka massacre
Intelligenzaktion Pommern
Jedwabne pogrom
Jeziorko woodland cemetery
Kidnapping of Polish children by Nazi Germany
Krasowo-Częstki massacre (83 children)
Lviv pogroms
Massacres of Poles in Volhynia
Michniów massacre (48 children)
Murders of children by Josef Mengele
Pacification Operations in German occupied Poland
Planned destruction of Warsaw
Ponary massacre
Operation Tannenberg
Szczecyn massacre (71 children)
Valley of Death (Bydgoszcz)

 1942
2 July, murder of children of Lidice in the Kulmhof extermination camp (82 children)

 1943
12 March, Murder of Czesława Kwoka in KZ Auschwitz-Birkenau (1 child)
23 May, Kielce cemetery massacre (45 children)
3 August, Szczurowa massacre (93 people, including children)
29 September, Ostrówki massacre (246 children)
29 September, Wola Ostrowiecka massacre (220 children)

 1944

28 February, Huta Pieniacka massacre
28 – 29 February, Korosciatyn Massacre (c. 150 people, including children)
2 June, Murder of Yekusiel Yehudah Halberstam's children (9 children)
4–August 25, Ochota massacre (c. 10,000 people, including children)
5 – 8 August, Wola massacre (40,000 up to 100,000 people, including children)

Russia 

The Holocaust in Russia
Commissar Order
World War II German war crimes in the Soviet Union
German war crimes during the Battle of Moscow

Serbia 
 1941
20–21 October Kragujevac massacre (2,778–2,794 civilians killed, including 217 children)
15-20 October Kraljevo massacre (2000 civilians killed)

Slovenia 
 1942
22 July Celje prison massacre (Celje, 100 civilians killed)
2 October Maribor prison massacre (Maribor, 143 civilians killed)
 1945
12 February Frankolovo crime (Frankolovo, 100 civilians killed)

Ukraine 
The Holocaust in Ukraine
Babi Yar
List of victims of the Babi Yar massacre
Drobytsky Yar
Lviv pogroms
Massacres of Poles in Volhynia

 1941
June, Czechow massacre (6 children)
August 27–28, Kamianets-Podilskyi massacre; 23,600 people (including women and children)
September 5, Pavoloch massacre; 1,500 people (including women and children)
September 16–30, Nikolaev massacre; 35,782 people (including women and children)
29 – 30 September, Babi Jar massacre (33,771 people, including children: List of victims of the Babi Yar massacre)
October 5, Berdychiv massacre, 20,000–38,536 people (including women and children)
October 22–24, 1941 Odessa massacre, 125,000-134,000 people (including women and children)
December 15, Drobitsky Yar, 16,000 people (including women and children)

 1943
1 – 2 March 1943, Koriukivka massacre
19 March 1943, Ozerjany massacre (267 people).
Second half of March, Kharkov massacre following the Third Battle of Kharkov (2500 people).
29 September, Wola Ostrowiecka massacre (220 children)
December 10, Tarassiwka massacre; 400 people (including women and children)

 1944
28 February, Huta Pieniacka massacre
28 – 29 February, Korosciatyn Massacre (c. 150 people, including children)

See also

 Racial policy of Nazi Germany
 War crimes of the Wehrmacht
 Nazi crime
 Nazism
 Bombing of Guernica
 Chronicles of Terror
 Command responsibility
 Consequences of Nazism
 Einsatzgruppen
 Generalplan Ost
 Nazi concentration camps
 Italian war crimes
 Japanese war crimes
 Internment of German Americans
 List of Axis personnel indicted for war crimes
 List of war crimes
 Nazi crimes against the Polish nation
 Pacification actions in German-occupied Poland
 Soviet war crimes
 Nuremberg trials
 War crimes in occupied Poland during World War II
 Allied war crimes during World War II

Notes

References
This article incorporates text from the United States Holocaust Memorial Museum, and has been released under the GFDL.
United States Holocaust Memorial Museum – Article Children during the Holocaust; and online exhibitions Life in the Shadows; and Give Me Your Children
Holocaust Memorial Album Honoring more than 1.5 Million Souls Under 12 years of age that never returned ... from Holocaust Survivors and Remembrance Project: "Forget You Not"
Children and the Holocaust
Nazis kidnap Polish children
The War Crimes of Dr Josef Mengele
German War Crimes of World War I
The Reich's forgotten atrocity
 Media (on-line)

The Atrocities committed by German-Fascists in the USSR 
 Stills from Soviet documentary "The Atrocities committed by German Fascists in the USSR" ((1); (2); (3))
 Slide show "Nazi Crimes in the USSR (Graphic images!)"

 
German Empire in World War I
Germany in World War II
War crimes
War crimes committed by country
War